Jaron Ennis is an American professional boxer who has held the IBF interim welterweight title since January 2023. As an amateur, he won a silver and gold medal at the U.S. National Golden Gloves Championships in 2014 and 2015 respectively.

Professional career
Ennis made his professional debut on April 30, 2016, defeating Cory Muldrew via first-round knockout (KO) at the Dixie Center in St. George, Utah. He fought a further seven times in 2016, scoring four consecutive stoppage wins over Luis Ramos in May; Deshawn Debose in June; Tavorus Teague in July; and Matt Murphy in August. Ennis went the distance for the first time in September, defeating Eddie Diaz by unanimous decision (UD) in a scheduled four-round bout. He saw out the year with two more stoppage wins over Chris Alexander in November and Marcus Beckford in December.

He began 2017 with a first-round KO victory over Elvin Perez in January, followed by the second decision win of his career; a UD against James Winchester in March. Ennis had a further seven fights in 2017, winning all seven by stoppage; Eduardo Flores in May; Wilfredo Acuña and Robert Hill in June; Ricardo Cano in August; Lionel Jiménez in September; Ayi Bruce in October; and George Sosa in December.

Professional boxing record

Notes

References

External links

1997 births
Living people
American male boxers
Boxers from Philadelphia
African-American boxers
Welterweight boxers
National Golden Gloves champions